Fitzroy "Buck" Newsum (May 22, 1918 – January 5, 2013) was an American military pilot and officer who was one of the original members of the Tuskegee Airmen during World War II. He reached the rank of colonel before retiring in 1970.

Early life
"Buck" Newsum was born on the Upper West Side of Manhattan, New York City, on May 22, 1918. He was raised on the island of Barbados, where he saw his first airplane, a Curtiss Robin, land near his home in 1929 when he was 10 years old.

He graduated from the College of Military Science at the University of Maryland. He joined the New York National Guard in 1939 He was second lieutenant in the Anti-Aircraft Coast Artillery Corps in 1941 and was sent to Hawaii, where he commanded an anti-aircraft missile group on the islands, following the attack on Pearl Harbor. After graduation he served in the New York National Guard.

Military career

During World War II, President Franklin D. Roosevelt arranged for thirty-three African American servicemen to take an entrance exam for the Army Air Corps. Newsum was one of just thirteen men to pass the test. After passing, he chose to attend the Tuskegee Army Air Field's flight school rather than the Officer Candidate School that the other twelve men enrolled in. Newsum would pilot the P-47 Thunderbolt warplane during the war.

Freeman Field Mutiny
He was one of ten officers to preside over the Freemen Field Mutiny Court-Martials. Ten officers presided over the court-martials. They were appointed by General Frank O'Driscoll Hunter. Colonel Benjamin O. Davis Jr., Captain George L. Knox II, Captain James T. Wiley, captain John H. Duren, Captain Charles R. Stanton, captain William T. Yates, Captain Elmore M. Kennedy, Captain Fitzroy Newsum, 1st Lieutenant William Robert Ming Jr., 1st Lieutenant James Y. Carter  Trial Judge Advocates were: Captain James W. Redden and 1st Lieutenant Charles B. Hall.

Career
He later obtained a master's degree in public administration from the University of Oklahoma. He reached the rank of colonel before retiring in 1970. Newsum worked as a public relations manager at Martin Marietta in Denver, Colorado, after leaving the military.

The Tuskegee Airmen were awarded the Congressional Gold Medal in 2006. He was inducted into the  Colorado Aviation Hall of Fame in 1991.

Death
Newsum died in Denver, Colorado, on January 5, 2013, at the age of 95. He was buried at Fort Logan National Cemetery with full military honors. Newsum was survived by his wife of sixty-six years, Joan Carney Newsum, four children and four grandchildren. U.S. Senator Mark Udall also paid tribute to Newsum following his death, noting that he proudly served as the U.S. military despite the segregation of the era.

See also
 Dogfights (TV series)
 Executive Order 9981
 Freeman Field Mutiny
 List of Tuskegee Airmen
 Military history of African Americans
 The Tuskegee Airmen (movie)

References

Notes

1918 births
2013 deaths
Tuskegee Airmen
United States Army Air Forces officers
United States Army Air Forces pilots of World War II
University of Maryland, College Park alumni
University of Oklahoma alumni
People from Denver
Military personnel from New York City
African-American aviators
Burials at Fort Logan National Cemetery
21st-century African-American people
Military personnel from Colorado